Shelby Township, Indiana may refer to one of the following places:

 Shelby Township, Jefferson County, Indiana
 Shelby Township, Ripley County, Indiana
 Shelby Township, Shelby County, Indiana
 Shelby Township, Tippecanoe County, Indiana

See also

Shelby Township (disambiguation)

Indiana township disambiguation pages